This is an extension of ISO 8859-14 for Windows CeltScript fonts. It deprecated CER-GS when this character encoding was updated in August 1998.

Character set

 Before August 1998, the character 0x26 mapped to both & and ⁊ (Unicode character U+204A), which were unified.
 Before August 1998 the code point 0x80 was empty.
 Before August 1998, the character 0x84 mapped to ±, Unicode character U+00B1.

References

Windows code pages